Pictures is an album by Timo Maas released in 2005. The second studio album of original tracks to be released by Maas, the tracks range from house to indie dance, with many of the tracks having a sinister feel. Brian Molko, lead singer of the band Placebo, appears on three tracks, including the single "First Day".

Track listing
All tracks written by Martin Buttrich and Timo Maas unless stated:

"Slip in Electro Kid" – 3:13
"Pictures (ft. Brian Molko)" – 5:11 (written by Molko/Buttrich/Maas)
"First Day (ft. Brian Molko)" – 3:52 (written by Molko/Benson/Buttrich/Maas)
"High Drama (ft. Neneh Cherry)" – 7:21 (written by Benson/Hagemeister/Buttrich/Cherry/Maas)
"Enter My World" – 6:35
"4 Ur Ears (ft. Kelis)" – 5:34 (written by Rogers/Buttrich/Kaiser/Maas)
"Release (ft. Rodney P)" – 3:33 (written by Ramsey/Buttrich/Thornton/Panton/Maas)
"Big Chevy" – 5:15
"Devil Feel (ft. Marc James and Anthony Tombling Jr.)" – 3:53 (written by Francolini/Hagemeister/James Buttrich/Maas)
"Burn Out" – 1:58
"Like Siamese (ft. Brian Molko)" – 4:54 (written by Molko/Hagemeister/Buttrich/Maas)
"Haven't We Met Before" – 2:34

Personnel
Timo Maas - production, keyboards, drum programming
Martin Buttrich - production, bass (3-7, 9), guitar (2, 3), piano (2), Rhodes electric piano (6), keyboards, drums

Vocalists
Brian Molko (2, 3, 11) - guitar on track 3
Jokate Benson (2, 3, 4)
Neneh Cherry (4)
Symphony of Voices (5)
Kelis (6)
Rodney P. (7)
Anthony Tombling Jr. (9)
Marc James (9)
choir on track 9 arranged by Phil Barnes

Other musicians on the album
Sven Kaiser - orchestration (1, 2, 9, 12), Rhodes electric piano (2, 6)
Martin Margot Gontarski - bass (2, 8, 10, 11)
Dominik Decker - guitar (2, 6)
Malte Hagemeister - guitar (4, 6, 9, 11)
 Ingo Schroder - guitar (5, 6)
Richie Staringer - Rhodes electric piano (6)
Lord Wax - scratches (6)
Christian Decker - bass (11)
Albrecht Husen - cymbal (11)

String section, tracks 1, 2, 9, and 12:
Andrea Soldan, Sebastian Marock - viola
Dana Anke, Katherina Kowalski, Katie Vitalie, Kirstieb Ibarra, Stefan Pintev - violin
Boris Matchin, Yuri Christiansen Bertelsmann - cello
Katherina C. Bunners - double bass

Songs relationship
The Timo Maas' song "First Day" (with Brian Molko) shows similarity with The Sisters Of Mercy's song "This Corrosion" by the chorus melody.

References
"Pictures" at www.discogs.com

2005 albums
Timo Maas albums